Gary Hinton (born 1956-08-29 in Darby, PA) was an American boxer at welterweight.

Professional career 
Hinton turned pro in 1978.In 1985 he challenged Aaron Pryor for the IBF light welterweight title and lost a split decision over 15 rounds. When Pryor was stripped of his title for not defending it, he won the vacant IBF light welterweight title with a decision win over Reyes Antonio Cruz in 1986. He lost the title in his first defense to Joe Manley by KO later that year.

External links 
 

1956 births
World boxing champions
International Boxing Federation champions
Living people
American male boxers
Welterweight boxers